The 2020 elections for the Indiana House of Representatives were held on Tuesday, November 3, 2020, to elect representatives from all 100 districts. The primary election occurred on June 2, 2020. The Republican Party has held a House majority since 2010. Indiana legislators assume office on the second Tuesday after the general election.

The elections for the United States President, Indiana's 9 congressional districts, Indiana's Governor race, and the Indiana Senate were held on this date.

Predictions

Results

Elections by district

District 1

Results

District 2

Results

District 3

Results

District 4

Results

District 5

Results

District 6
Democrat B. Patrick Bauer announced he would be not seek re-election. There were three Democrats running in the primaries including Bauer's daughter, Maureen Bauer.

Results

District 7

Results

District 8

Results

District 9

Results

District 10

Results

District 11

Results

District 12
Democrat Mara Candelaria Reardon announced she would be not seek re-election in the 12th district leaving the seat open.

Results

District 13

Results

District 14

Results

District 15

Results

District 16

Results

District 17

Results

District 18
Republican incumbent David Wolkins did not file to run for re-election.

Results

District 19

Results

District 20

Results

District 21

Results

District 22

Results

District 23

Results

District 24

Results

District 25

Results

District 26

Results

District 27

Results

District 28

Results

District 29

Results

District 30

Results

District 31

Results

District 32

Results

District 33

Results

District 34

Results

District 35

Results

District 36

Results

District 37

Results

District 38

Results

District 39

Results

District 40

Results

District 41

Results

District 42

Results

District 43

Results

District 44

Results

District 45

Results

District 46

Results

District 47

Results

District 48

Results

District 49

Results

District 50

Results

District 51

Results

District 52

Results

District 53

Results

District 54

Results

District 55

Results

District 56

Results

District 57

Results

District 58
Republican Charles "Woody" Burton retired after being in office since 1988. His retirement left the seat open in this election.

Results

District 59

Results

District 60

Results

District 61

Results

District 62

Results

District 63

Results

District 64

Results

District 65

Results

District 66

Results

District 67

Results

District 68

Results

District 69

Results

District 70

Results

District 71

Results

District 72

Results

District 73

Results

District 74

Results

District 75
Republican Ron Bacon did not file for re-election leaving his seat open.

Results

District 76

Results

District 77

Results

District 78

Results

District 79

Results

District 80

Results

District 81

Results

District 82

Results

District 83

Results

District 84

Results

District 85

Results

District 86

Results

District 87

Results

District 88

Results

District 89

Results

District 90

Results

District 91

Results

District 92
Democrat Karlee Macer did not seek re-election.

Results

District 93
Republican incumbent Dollyne Sherman lost in the primaries to John Jacob.

Results

District 94

Results

District 95

Results

District 96

Results

District 97

Results

District 98

Results

District 99

Results

District 100

Results

References

Indiana House of Representatives
Indiana House
Indiana House of Representatives elections